Moul may refer to:

People
 Alfred Moul (1852–1924), musician
 Dan Moul (born 1959), American politician
 Fred E. Moul, American politician
 Jamie Moul (born 1984), English golfer
 Maxine Moul (born 1947), American politician
 Moul Daravorn (born 1993), Cambodian football player

Places
 Moul Falls, Canada

Other
 MOUL or Myst Online: Uru Live, videogame